After the Dance may refer to:
After the Dance (play), a 1939 play by Terence Rattigan
"After the Dance" (song), a 1976 song by Marvin Gaye
After the Dance (film), a 1935 American drama film